SDU: Sex Duties Unit is a 2013 Hong Kong action comedy film directed by Gary Mak and starring Chapman To, Shawn Yue, Matt Chow and Derek Tsang. SDU: Sex Duties Unit was one of the films to be presented at the 2013 Hong Kong FILMART. This film was released on 25 July 2013 in Hong Kong.

Plot
The Special Duties Unit (SDU) is an elite paramilitary tactical unit of the Hong Kong Police Force and is considered one of the world's finest in its role. But being the best carries its own burdens. Like everyone else, they go through troubles with love, with family and with their jobs. And sometimes they get horny.

This touching story is about Special Duties Unit Team B and their trip to Macau for a weekend of unadulterated debauchery.

Cast
Chapman To as Siu Keung
Shawn Yue as Fu
Matt Chow as Ka Ho
Derek Tsang as Hai Mai
Liu Anqi as Sai Sai
Dada Chan as Siu Keung's ex-wife
Jim Chim as procurer
Siu Yam-yam as procurer
Simon Lui as boatman
Lam Suet as robber
June Lam as prostitute
Benz Hui as pharmacy owner
JJ Jia as pharmacy owner's daughter
Lau Kong as Ka Ho's father
Pong Nan as procurer's assistant
Michael Wong as SDU superior
Ken Lo as Thief King To
Joe Tay as jewelry store employee
Lawrence Chou as Macau police sergeant
Ken Wong as Macau police sergeant
Tony Ho as Macau police constable

Reception
SDU: Sex Duties Unit earned HK$16,711,696 at the Hong Kong box office.

Andrew Chan of the Film Critics Circle of Australia writes, " “SDU: Sex Duties Unit” is certainly not as good as Vulgaria in terms of quality filmmaking, but it is most certainly outrageously funny and sometimes, that is precisely what the local audience demands."

It was released to Blu-ray, DVD, VCD on 5 December 2013.

References

External links
 

SDU: Sex Duties Unit film review at HK Neo Reviews
SDU: Sex Duties Unit at Hong Kong Cinemagic
SDU: Sex Duties Unit at Chinesmov.com

2013 films
2013 action comedy films
Hong Kong action comedy films
Media Asia films
2010s Cantonese-language films
Films set in Macau
Films shot in Macau
2013 comedy films
2010s Hong Kong films